The Namibia Nurses Union commonly known as NANU is a Namibian trade union formed in 1999 to represent Namibian Nurses. Since independence, it has been the only vanguard representative of Nurses in Namibia.

In 2020, the Union, through its acting Secretary General Junias Shilunga gave a memorandum to start a student union aimed at representing the plights of nursing students across Namibia.

See also
Trade Union Congress of Namibia

References

Organisations based in Namibia